San Costanzo is a comune (municipality) in the Province of Pesaro e Urbino in the Italian region Marche, located about  northwest of Ancona and about  southeast of Pesaro.

Geography
The municipality of San Costanzo contains three frazioni (subdivisions, mainly villages and hamlets) Cerasa, Solfanuccio, and Stacciola. A minor portion of Marotta belongs to the municipality.

San Costanzo borders the following municipalities: Fano, Mondolfo, Monte Porzio, Monterado, Terre Roveresche.

References

External links

Cities and towns in the Marche